The European Badminton Championships is a tournament organized by the Badminton Europe (BE). The first of these competitions was held in 1968.  The competition was held once every two years to determine the best badminton players in Europe. European Mixed Team Badminton Championships usually started prior to the individual championships until it was split in 2009. From 2017 on the European badminton championship is held annually except for the year with European Games. Since 2008, it is being graded as a Grand Prix Gold tournament by the Badminton World Federation.

Championships 
The table below gives an overview of all host cities and countries of the European Championships. On 15 January 2008, Manchester of England won the bid to stage the 2010 event which saw the separation the team event into different championships. Starting from 2017, the championship will be an annual event except for the year with European Games. The 2020 edition in Kyiv, Ukraine, had to be cancelled due to COVID-19 pandemic and the hosting rights of the 2021 edition was reallocated to Ukraine again.

Past winners

Individual events (1968–present)

Performances by nation

Medal count

* Russian medals included medals won by the USSR and the CIS
* German medals included medals won by West Germany

Successful players
Below is the list of the most ever successful players in the European Badminton Championships:

Mixed team event (1972–2006)

Note

References

External links
 European Championships, Individuals at badmintoneurope.com

 
International badminton competitions
Badminton

1968 establishments in Europe
Recurring sporting events established in 1968